The Wedding Party is a 1969 American film farce created as a joint effort by Sarah Lawrence theater professor Wilford Leach and two of his students, protégé Brian De Palma and Cynthia Monroe. It was bankrolled by Stanley Borden, owner of American Films, De Palma's mentor and employer, who allowed De Palma to produce the film on company time. Leach went on to a successful career as a Tony Award-winning theatre director, while De Palma continued as a well-known film director.

The film focuses on a soon-to-be groom and his interactions with various relatives of his fiancée and members of the wedding party prior to the ceremony at the family's estate on Shelter Island, New York.

The film was made in 1963, with the on-screen copyright year being 1966. However, owing to a legal dispute between De Palma and Borden over the rights to the film (Borden thought it was not ready for release, and De Palma insisted on final cut), the film was not released until 1969, after one of its supporting players, Robert De Niro, had begun to draw notice for his work in off-Broadway theatre and De Palma's 1968 release Greetings. Also in the cast were Jennifer Salt and William Finley, both of whom were De Palma regulars, and fellow Sarah Lawrence student Jill Clayburgh as the bride-to-be.

The film is now available on DVD from Troma Films, and on Blu-ray as part of Arrow Films' 2018 box set De Niro & De Palma: The Early Films.

Cast
 Velda Setterfield as Mrs. Fish
 Raymond McNally as Mr. Fish
 John Braswell as Reverend Oldfield
 Charles Pfluger as Charlie
 Jill Clayburgh as Josephine
 William Finley as Alistair
 Robert De Niro (Credited as Robert DeNero) as Cecil
 Jennifer Salt as Phoebe

Home Media

The Wedding Party was released on Blu-Ray by Arrow Films on December 11, 2018, as part of the De Niro And De Palma: The Early Films Blu-Ray set. The set also includes the films Greetings (1968 film) and Hi, Mom! (1970), which are both directed by De Palma and star De Niro.

See also
 List of American films of 1969

External links
 
 
 
 
 
 New York Times review

1969 films
1969 comedy films
1960s black comedy films
1960s English-language films
American black comedy films
American black-and-white films
Films about weddings in the United States
Films directed by Brian De Palma
Films set in New York (state)
Films shot in New York City
Troma Entertainment films
1960s American films